Samuel Farr, M.D. (1741– 11 March 1795) was an English physician.

Life

Farr was born at Taunton, Somerset, in 1741. His parents were Protestant Dissenters. He was educated first at Warrington Academy, then at the University of Edinburgh, and finally at Leiden University, where he took the degree of MD (1765). He was a physician to the Bristol Infirmary from 1767 to 1780, and practised for some years in Bristol. He was elected a Fellow of the Royal Society in 1779 (although his election may have been subsequently voided for non-appearance).

Returning to Taunton he acquired an extensive practice there. He died at Upcott, near Taunton, in the house of John Fisher, on 11 March 1795.

Works

His published works are:

‘An Essay on the Medical Virtues of Acids,’ London, 1769.
 ‘A Philosophical Inquiry into the Nature, Origin, and Extent of Animal Motion, deduced from the principles of reason and analogy,’ London, 1771.
 ‘Aphorismi de Marasmo ex summis Medicis collecti,’ 1772.
 ‘Inquiry into the Propriety of Blood-letting in Consumption,’ 1775; against the practice.
 ‘The History of Epidemics, by Hippocrates, in seven books; translated into English from the Greek, with Notes and Observations,’ &c.
 ‘A Preliminary Discourse on the Nature and Cure of Infection,’ London, 1781.
 ‘Elements of Medical Jurisprudence,’ London, 1788; 2nd edit. 1811; a translation from the work of Faselius, with additions by the translator.
 ‘On the Use of Cantharides in Dropsical Complaints’ (Memoirs Med. ii. 132, 1789).

References

1741 births
1795 deaths
People from Taunton
Alumni of the University of Edinburgh
Leiden University alumni
18th-century English medical doctors
English medical writers
18th-century English non-fiction writers
18th-century English male writers
Fellows of the Royal Society